is a professional Japanese baseball catcher. He last played professionally for the Chunichi Dragons.

Professional career

In the 2015 off-season he along with team mates Tomohiro Hamada, Shuhei Takahashi, Shota Tomonaga and Junki Kishimoto were loaned to the Taiwanese winter league

External links
 NPB.com

References

1991 births
Living people
Baseball people from Osaka
Japanese baseball players
Nippon Professional Baseball catchers
Chunichi Dragons players